The Challenge UK is the British adaptation of the American reality competition series The Challenge. The series is a reality competition show, which premiered on 20 February 2023 on Channel 5 and is presented by Mark Wright.

Background
In February 2022, a new series of international seasons of The Challenge was announced to air later in the year. The series comprises four new editions of The Challenge, which includes The Challenge: USA, The Challenge: Australia, The Challenge Argentina: El Desafío and The Challenge: UK. These local renditions are expected to be followed by a fifth series in which winners and select contestants of each series will compete again on another season titled The Challenge: World Championship, which is expected to air on Paramount+.

In August 2022, it was reported that a British version of The Challenge was in development and that various reality television stars had signed up to appear on the series. The series features sixteen stars of sport and entertainment take on a series of athletic battles, while also trying to avoid elimination rounds and deal with the gameplay of other contestants in a bid to win £100,000. It was later confirmed that former The Only Way Is Essex cast member Mark Wright would be set to present the series.

Contestants

Format
The Challenge UK consists of a main challenge, a winners' selection and an elimination round. 
Daily Challenge: Players compete in the main challenge in male/female teams of two. The last-place team is automatically sent to the elimination round. The winners earn the power to select a second team to compete in the elimination against the last-place team.
Eliminations ("The Arena"): The last-place team from the daily challenge compete in an elimination round against the team selected by the winners of the daily challenge. The winners remain in the game while the losers are eliminated.

 Twists
The Algorithm: Introduced after the first elimination, an algorithm assigns players a new partner of the opposite gender for the next game cycle. Players must be assigned a new partner they haven't been paired with, or cannot have the same partner twice in a row if they have already partnered with each eligible remaining player.

Gameplay

Challenge games
Meet Me Halfway: Each team member faces off on a beam against a same-gender opponent from another team and attempts to push their opponent into the water below as fast as possible. The four teams that win the most matchups advance to the final round and repeat this process. The team from the final round with the most matchup wins, in the fastest time in the case of a tie, wins. The team that loses both their matchups in the fastest time is automatically sent to the Arena.
Winners: Ashley & Kaz C.
Peaking Blinders: Teams race down a path to a pattern covered by blinds. There, one team member must balance one-footed on a narrow pole to open the blinds and reveal the pattern for their partner to memorise. After the team member balancing falls off, teams must return to their board at the start and attempt to replicate their pattern, repeating this process until they correctly recreate the entire pattern. The first team to finish wins while the last team to finish is automatically sent to the Arena.
Winners: Ella & Nathan
Getting Tyred: Teams race to an abandoned town where they can collect tyres or tokens and bring them to their station to earn points. Tokens are worth 1 point while tyres are worth 5, 10, 15 or 20 points. However, teams must complete various tasks to obtain tyres; the more points a tyre is worth, the harder the task is. Teams continue this process for two hours. The team with the most points at the end of two hours wins while the team fewest points is automatically sent to the Arena.
Winners: Arabella & Ashley
Frozen Senseless: One team member must feel through a covered box at one end of a course for three cubes with shapes on each face. They must then meet their partner describe the pattern to them so they can assemble the cubes using puzzle pieces at the other end of the course. However, teams must immerse themselves in an ice bath at the middle of the course while communicating the descriptions. The first team to correctly assemble their cubes wins while the last team is automatically sent to the Arena.
Winners: AJ & Kaz C.

Arena games
Knot So Fast: Teams have 20 minutes to create as many knots as they can using a 50-metre rope within a pyramid structure. After those 20 minutes are up, teams switch positions and must untie their opponent's knots. The first team to untie their opponent's knots and drag the rope across a marked line wins. 
Played by: Aisleyne & James vs. Courtney & Curtis
Pato Brawl: Played in male and female rounds. Each round, team members of the designated gender begin at the center of the Arena with both hands on a pato ball. The first player to wrestle the ball out of their opponent's hands two out of three times wins the round for their team. The first team to win two rounds wins.
Played by: AJ & Arabella vs. Curtis & Kaz K.
Ball and Chain:  Teams open six panels at the top of a tall wall to reveal six trivia questions. They must search among several 15-kilogram medicine balls wrapped in chains for six with the answers on them, and hang them on hooks below their respective question. The first team to correctly answer all six questions wins.
Played by: AJ & Courtney vs. Danni & Marcel
Balls In: Played in male and female rounds. Each round, team members of the designated gender play both offense and defense. The offense player has three attempts to deposit a ball into a goal at the center of a ring while the defense player attempts to stop them by blocking them and knocking the ball out of bounds. Players then switch roles and repeat the process. The player who scores the most goals wins the round for their team. The first team to win two rounds wins.
Played by: Arabella & Nathan vs. Ashley & Ella

Final Challenge
The final eight contestants competed in the Final Challenge, where they completed timed checkpoints in male-female pairs. For the first two checkpoints, players competed in teams determined by the Algorithm at the end of the "Balls In" elimination; the last team to complete the first two checkpoints were eliminated. Afterwards, the remaining six players completed the final two checkpoints — in which the Algorithm selected new teams for each checkpoint.

At the end of the Final Challenge, each individual's time from the four checkpoints were accumulated to determine the male and female winners of UK, who receive £50,000 each.
Checkpoint #1: Teams must collectively cycle 100km on a stationary bike before proceeding to the next checkpoint.
Checkpoint #2: Teams swim through a swamp to collect bags of puzzle pieces at two platforms. After returning the puzzle pieces to their station, teams must then run down a path to view and memorize an answer key before recreating the key at their station using the puzzle pieces. Once complete, teams then proceed to the next Algorithm — the last team to reach the Algorithm is eliminated from the Final Challenge.
Eliminated: AJ & Arabella (4th place)
Checkpoint #3: Teams must untangle a chain, pull sled across a field and arrange four cubes on the sled so each side shows four unique symbols.
Checkpoint #4: Teams must transfer tyres labelled with the names of eliminated contestants and elimination games, including several decoy names, down a track. There, they must arrange the tyres on a pole to show the correct order the contestants were eliminated and the elimination they lost in. Once complete, teams must push a car across a field before proceeding to the finish line where the results are announced.
 Final results
Male
Winner: Tristan (5 hours, 15 minutes, 55 seconds)
Runner-up: Nathan (6 hours, 17 minutes, 52 seconds)
Third place: Callum (6 hours, 29 minutes, 9 seconds)
Female
Winner: Kaz C. (5 hours, 55 minutes, 18 seconds)
Runner-up: Zara (5 hours, 56 minutes, 17 seconds)
Third place: Courtney (6 hours, 11 minutes, 21 seconds)

Game summary

Episode progress

Competition key
 The contestant won the Final Challenge
 The contestant did not win the Final Challenge
 The contestant was eliminated during the Final Challenge
 The contestant won the daily challenge
 The contestant was not selected for the Arena
 The contestant won the elimination in the Arena 
 The contestant lost in the Arena and was eliminated

Team progress
For the first episode, players chose their own teams prior to the "Meet Me Halfway" challenge. From episode two, teams were decided by the Algorithm.

Episodes

References

2023 British television seasons
2023 British television series debuts
2023 British television series endings
2020s British reality television series
British television series based on American television series
British television spin-offs
UK, The Challenge
Television shows filmed in Argentina
Television shows set in Argentina
Channel 5 (British TV channel) original programming
Reality television spin-offs